The 1979 Centennial Cup is the ninth Tier II Junior "A" 1979 ice hockey National Championship for the Canadian Junior A Hockey League.

The Centennial Cup was competed for by the winners of the Abbott Cup, Dudley Hewitt Cup, and the Callaghan Cup.

The tournament was hosted by the Prince Albert Raiders  in the city of Prince Albert, Saskatchewan.

The Playoffs

Round Robin

Results
Prince Albert Raiders defeated Sherwood-Parkdale Metros 7-2
Sherwood-Parkdale Metros defeated Guelph Holoday Platers 6-5
Prince Albert Raiders  defeated Guelph Holoday Platers 5-4
Prince Albert Raiders defeated Sherwood-Parkdale Metros 8-6
Guelph Holoday Platers defeated Prince Albert Raiders 6-3
Sherwood-Parkdale Metros defeated Guelph Holoday Platers 5-4

Final

Please note: Overtime final.

Awards
Most Valuable Player: Dunston Carroll (Sherwood-Parkdale Metros)
Most Sportsmanlike Player: Dave Moore (Prince Albert Raiders)

All-Star Team
Forward
Dunston Carroll (Sherwood-Parkdale Metros)
Eric Ponath (Prince Albert Raiders)
Mike Marquis (Guelph Holoday Platers)
Defence
Brian Ostroski (Sherwood-Parkdale Metros)
Dean Burles (Prince Albert Raiders)
Goal
Mark Davidner (Prince Albert Raiders)

Roll of League Champions
AJHL: Fort Saskatchewan Traders
BCJHL: Bellingham Blazers
CJHL: Hawkesbury Hawks
IJHL: Sherwood-Parkdale Metros
MJHL: Selkirk Steelers
MVJHL: Halifax Lions
NBJHL:
NOJHL: Nickel Centre Native Sons
OPJHL: Guelph Platers
PacJHL: Richmond Sockeyes
QJAHL:
SJHL: Prince Albert Raiders

See also
Canadian Junior A Hockey League
Royal Bank Cup
Anavet Cup
Doyle Cup
Dudley Hewitt Cup
Fred Page Cup
Abbott Cup
Mowat Cup

External links
Royal Bank Cup Website

1979
Ice hockey competitions in Saskatchewan
Cup
Sport in Prince Albert, Saskatchewan